Jiménez or Jimenez may refer to:

People
 Jiménez (surname), a Spanish name, includes the name Jimenez
 Jiménez dynasty, a medieval Iberian ruling family, including a list of members

Places

Mexico
 Ciudad Jiménez, a city in Chihuahua (officially "José Mariano Jiménez")
 Cadereyta Jiménez, a city in Nuevo León
 Huautla de Jiménez, a town in Oaxaca
 Jiménez Municipality, Coahuila
 Jiménez Territory, former subdivision
 Jiménez, Coahuila, a town and the municipal seat
 Jiménez, Tamaulipas, a town in Tamaulipas

Other places

 Jiménez Department, a department in Santiago del Estero Province, Argentina
 Jiménez (canton), a canton in the province of Cartago, Costa Rica
 Jimenez, Misamis Occidental, a municipality in Misamis Occidental, Philippines
 Jiménez, Río Grande, Puerto Rico, a barrio in Puerto Rico, U.S.

Other uses
 Jimenez Arms, former American manufacturer of firearms, now JA Industries
 Grupo León Jimenes, the largest company in the Dominican Republic
 a French automobile manufacturer, see Jimenez Novia

See also 
 Jiménez Municipality (disambiguation)
 Giménez
 Ximénez (disambiguation)